The Armed Forces Institute of Regenerative Medicine (AFIRM) is a federally funded institution in the United States, which is committed to develop clinical therapies for the following five areas:
 Burn repair
 Wound healing without scarring
 Craniofacial reconstruction
 Limb reconstruction, regeneration or transplantation
 Compartment syndrome, a condition related to inflammation after surgery or injury that can lead to increased pressure, impaired blood flow, nerve damage and muscle death

The Institute was established in 2008 by the United States Department of Defense.

References

External links 
 

Hospitals established in 2008
United States Army medical installations